Solimonas soli is a Gram-negative and non-motile  bacterium from the genus of Solimonas which has been isolated from soil from a ginseng field in Korea.

References

Bacteria described in 2007
Gammaproteobacteria